"Mary the Paralegal" is the 19th episode in the first season of the television series How I Met Your Mother. It originally aired on April 24, 2006.

Plot 
A story that Robin did on her news channel was nominated for a Local Area Media Award (or as Lily calls it, a LAMA – pronounced LAME-a), and Robin has invited everyone to come to the awards banquet. Since she notified everyone three months in advance, Ted told her he would be bringing Victoria. Right before the awards banquet, Ted ended his relationship with Victoria and ruined his chances with Robin at the same time, and is wondering if he should still bring a date. Barney suggests getting Ted a prostitute as a date, which Ted immediately dismisses. Barney shows up a bit later with a stunning blonde-haired woman named Mary for Ted, and Ted again refuses until he sees Robin's date for the banquet: Sandy Rivers, the guy who reads the newspaper on the news show every morning and requests that he always be referred to by his full name. Ted then agrees, and Mary is his date for the evening.

At the banquet, Ted finds himself more and more attracted to Mary, who says she is a paralegal at a law firm downtown. Ted tries to talk to Robin to restore their friendship, but fails. Robin wins the award, and thanks all of her friends for coming and supporting her, except Ted. Meanwhile, Barney has got Ted a room in the hotel for the night, and Ted is beginning to think about whether he and Mary should go up to the room. Marshall tries to stop him, but without success. Ted and Mary head up to the room, while Robin and Sandy Rivers get a cab. Shortly afterward, Robin returns, reiterating that she does not date co-workers, and she brought Sandy Rivers only to make Ted jealous, and Marshall tells her that Ted brought Mary to make Robin jealous. Marshall then telepathically tells Lily that Mary is a prostitute, and Lily, who is asleep, wakes up and asks if Mary is indeed an escort. After a minute, Barney reveals that Mary is not really a prostitute, but a paralegal who lives in his building. Ted does not know this, and Mary eventually slaps him and leaves when Ted insists that she's a prostitute.

At the bar, Barney insists to Ted that the reason he got on so well with Mary the 'paralegal' was because he thought he was on to a sure thing anyway, but Ted reveals that he's had the last laugh by never checking out of the hotel room, and leaves to increase the already hefty bill on Barney's credit card.

Critical response 

Critic Ryan J Budke of TV Squad enjoyed the episode and praised it for being "true to life" in the way the characters relate to each other, noting everyone has someone they can have a "telepathic" conversation with.

References

External links 
 

How I Met Your Mother (season 1) episodes
2006 American television episodes